Jean-Adolphe Beaucé (2 August 1818 – 13 July 1875) was a French battle-scene painter. Born in Paris, he followed the French army on campaign from 1843 onwards in North Africa, the Middle East and Mexico. He also painted portraits of military figures and produced illustrations for several works by Alexandre Dumas pere such as The Three Musketeers, The Viscount of Bragelone and The Lady of Monsoreau. He died in the Parisian suburb of Boulogne-Billancourt and is buried in the 49th division of the cimetière du Père-Lachaise in Paris.

Works in public collections
Compiègne, château de Compiègne : General Niel at the Battle of Solférino, marouflage on canvas
L'Isle-Adam, musée Louis Senlecq : François Louis de Bourbon Prince de Conty Looking at a Battle Scene, print
Narbonne, musée d'art et d'histoire : Captain Lelièvre's Heroic Defence at Mazagran, oil on panel
Pau, musée des beaux-arts : Portrait of Marshal Bosquet
Troyes, musée Saint-Loup : Napoléon on the Bridge at Arcis-sur-Aube, oil on canvas
Versailles, château de Versailles

Illustrations

Dumas
Les Trois mousquetaires, Paris, Lecrivain et Toubon, 1875
Vingt ans après, Paris, Lecrivain et Toubon, 1885 
Les Qurantes-cinq, Paris, Calmann Lévy, 154 p.
Le Comte de Monte-Christo, Paris, Lecrivain et Toubon, 1860, 159 p.
Le Vicomte de Bragelonne, Paris, Marescq, 1875, 479 p.
Le Trou de l'enfer, Paris, Marescq et Cie, 1855, 154 p.
La Dame de Monsoreau, Paris, Librairie illustrée, 1875, 560 p.
Le Chevelier d'Harmental, Paris, Marescq, 1854

Other
Alain-René Lesage, Le Diable boiteux, Paris, G. Havard, 1849
Eugène de Mirecourt, Confessions de Marion Delorme, Paris, V. Bunel, 1876, 840 p. 
Ann Radcliffe, Les Mystères d'Udolphe, Paris, Marescq et Cie, 1869, 96 p.
Eugène Sue, Jean Bart et Louis XIV : drames maritimes du XVIIe siècle, Paris, Marescq et Cie, 1851, 490 p.
Eugène Sue, Les Mystères de Paris, Paris, [s.n.], 1851, 384 p. 
Victor Hugo, Les Burgraves, Paris, J. Hetzel, 48 p.
 Victor Hugo, Bug-Jargal, Paris, J. Hetzel, 1876
 Victor Hugo, Angelo, tyran de Padoue, 1866

Gallery

Bibliography
 'Beaucé, Jean-Adolphe' in David Karel, Dictionnaire des artistes de langue française en Amérique du Nord: peintres, sculpteurs, dessinateurs, graveurs, photographes et orfèvres, Presses Université Laval, 1992.
'Jean-Adolphe Beaucé', extract from the Dictionnaire Bénézit, on Oxford Index, 2006

References

Painters from Paris
1818 births
1875 deaths
French history painters
19th-century French painters
Burials at Père Lachaise Cemetery
French illustrators
French war artists
19th-century war artists
French portrait painters